Alefaio Vaisuai (born Moata'a, date of birth unknown) is a Samoan former rugby sevens player who played as flanker.

Career
At club level, Vaisuai played for Moata'a, which was the club where played many legends such as Michael Jones, Danny Kaleopa, Andy Aiolupo, Lolani Koko and Taufusi Salesa.  He took part in the 1993 Rugby World Cup Sevens playing for Samoa sevens, as well in the 1993-1994 Hong Kong Sevens, where in the latter he scored the winning try against Fiji. He also played the 1996 Punta del Este Sevens tournament.

Personal life
Currently he is married and has a daughter, and he lives in Glen Eden, Auckland.

Notes

External links

Date of birth unknown
Living people
Samoan rugby union players
Rugby union flankers
Samoan rugby sevens players
Samoa international rugby union players
Year of birth missing (living people)